The Pondicherry Representative Assembly was converted into the Legislative Assembly on 1 July 1963 as per Section 54(3) of The Union Territories Act, 1963. All the 39 members who were elected by 1959 were deemed to have been elected to the First Assembly of Pondicherry Première Assemblée de Pondichéry (1 July 1963 – 24 August 1964).

Background
The First Representative Assembly of Pondicherry which was constituted in 1955 after 1955 Pondicherry Representative Assembly election.  However, that government was not stable as the ruling party was ridden with personal strifes and factions. The Government of India had to intervene finally by dissolving the Assembly following the instability caused by the change of party affiliation of members. Then, the Chief Commissioner took over the administration in October 1958. Later, after nine months, second general elections were held to the Pondicherry Representative Assembly in 1959.

Important members
 Speaker:
A.S. Gangeyan from 22 July 1963 to 18 September 1964
 Deputy Speaker:
Kamichetty S.V. Rao Naidu from 27 November 1963 to 24 August 1964
 Chief minister:
 Edouard Goubert from  1 July 1963 to 24 August 1964
 Leader of opposition:
 V. Subbiah from  29 August 1964 – 19 September 1968

Members of the 1st Pondicherry Representative Assembly

Keys:

See also 
Government of Puducherry
List of Chief Ministers of Puducherry
List of lieutenant governors of Puducherry
Puducherry Legislative Assembly
Pondicherry Representative Assembly
1959 Pondicherry Representative Assembly election

References

Notes

Puducherry Legislative Assembly
Puducherry
1963 establishments in Pondicherry
1964 disestablishments in India